The Dyre family is an extinct, Danish medieval noble family.

History
The first known member of the family is Offe Dyre who is mentioned in  1308. The family had both a branch on Zealand and a branch in Jutland. The branch in Jutland also used the names  Skeel and Lunge while the branch on Zealand also used the name Sosadel. The last member of the family was Justitsråd Palle Dyre of Trinderup (died 1707).

Insignia
Its coat of arms featured two white bison horns on blue background. It helmet featured two white bison horns.

Property
The branch on Zealand is associated with the estates Tølløse, Selsø, Svenstrup, Gjorslev and Vindingegaard. The branch in Jutland is for instance associated with the estates Odden, Birkelse and Hessel.

Notable members
 Mette Dyre
 Source

References

External links
 Source

 
Danish noble families
Medieval Danish nobility